Gordon Haller (born 1950) is the winner of the first Ironman Triathlon.

Biography
Haller grew up in Forest Grove, Oregon and earned a degree in physics at Pacific University.

On Oahu, Hawaii in 1978, Haller  competed in Navy Commander John Collins’ race which combined the Waikiki Roughwater Swim, the Around-Oahu Bike Race, and the Honolulu Marathon. Of the 15 competitors, 12 finished what today is called the Ironman, and Gordon Haller was the first champion, with a time of 11 hours, 46 minutes, 58 seconds. In 1979, Haller placed fourth behind winner, Tom Warren.

Haller commented about the success of Ironman, nearly 30 years later in a 2007 interview with Competitor Magazine "It’s just an amazing experience... certainly something I didn’t expect to have happen way back in the beginning."

References

External links
The Competitors Radio Interview with Gordon Haller
ACTIVE.COM Ironman's first champ, Gordon Haller, looks back 25 years
USA TODAY - Original Ironman still racing hard

1950 births
American male triathletes
Ironman world champions
Pacific University alumni
Living people
People from Forest Grove, Oregon